The men's 1500 metres at the 2006 European Athletics Championships were held at the Ullevi stadium on August 7 and August 9, 2006.

Baala successfully defended his 2002 title, while Heshko pipped Higuero on the final stretch.

Medalists

Schedule

Results

Heats
First 4 in each heat (Q) and the next 4 fastest (q) advance to the Final.

Final

References

External links
Results

1500
1500 metres at the European Athletics Championships